Nathanaël Dieng (born 13 April 1997) is a French professional footballer who plays as defender for  club Red Star.

Career
A youth product of Saint-Étienne, Dieng joined his hometown club Grenoble in 2014, and went on loan with Rodez AF in 2018. He made his professional debut with Rodez in a 2–0 Ligue 2 win over AJ Auxerre on 26 July 2019.

Having been released by Rodez at the end of the 2020–21 season, Dieng moved to Red Star.

Personal life
Dieng is the younger brother of the footballer Timothée Dieng. Born in France, they are of Senegalese descent.

References

External links
 
 

1997 births
Living people
Sportspeople from Grenoble
French sportspeople of Senegalese descent
French footballers
Footballers from Auvergne-Rhône-Alpes
Association football defenders
Grenoble Foot 38 players
Rodez AF players
Red Star F.C. players
Ligue 2 players
Championnat National players
Championnat National 2 players
Championnat National 3 players